Nikenbah is a rural town and locality in the Fraser Coast Region, Queensland, Australia. In the  the locality of Nikenbah had a population of 657 people.

History 
The town was originally named Aalberg by Danish settlers. However, by 1883, it had acquired the name Nikenbah, which is a corruption of Aboriginal words (Kabi language), nguruin meaning emu and ba meaning place.

Nikenbah State School opened on 27 May 1913 and closed on 1963.

Glendyne Education and Training Centre opened in Nikenbah in 2002 as a special assistance school for children who are unsuited to mainstream schooling. It is operated by Carinity (formerly Queensland Baptist Care).

In the  the locality of Nikenbah had a population of 657 people.

Education 
Glendyne Education and Training Centre is a private primary and secondary (6-12) special school for boys and girls at 72 Nikenbah-Dundowran Road. In 2018, the school had an enrolment of 116 students with 12 teachers (10 full-time equivalent) and 18 non-teaching staff (14 full-time equivalent).

There are no mainstream schools in Nikenbah. The nearest primary schools are Yarrilee State School in neighbouring Urraween to the north and Kawungan State School in neighbouring Kawungan to the north-east. The nearest secondary schools are Hervey Bay State High School in Pialba to the north and Urangan State High School in Urangan to the north-east.

Amenities 
The Hervey Bay Baptist Church is at 20 Nikenbah-Dundowran Road. It is planned to establish a senior school campus of the Hervey Bay Christian College (a Baptist Church school in Urraween) on the same site as the church.

References

External links 

 

Towns in Queensland
Fraser Coast Region
Localities in Queensland